Pizza Cheeks is a pizzeria located on South Phillips Avenue in Sioux Falls, South Dakota that opened for business in November 2020 under Jordan Paul Taylor and Barry Putzke.

History
Pizza Cheeks opened for business in late November 2020 as located inside, yet is a separate entity from Taylor and Putzke's Hello Hi Bar. The pizzeria makes pizza to order, letting the dough ferment for 2 days, as well as selling individual slices of "mainstays" such as veggie and pepperoni.

References

Companies based in Sioux Falls, South Dakota
Pizzerias in the United States
2020 establishments in South Dakota
Restaurants established in 2020